Mar Azul may refer to:

Mar Azul, Buenos Aires Province, a village in Argentina,
Mar Azul, a neighborhood of Pichilemu, Chile,
Mar Azul, football team in Honduras, see Alianza de Becerra,
Mar Azul (album), a music album by Cabo Verdean singer Cesaria Evora.